Michael Raymond Kelly (born June 2, 1970) is an American former Major League Baseball outfielder for the Atlanta Braves, Cincinnati Reds, Tampa Bay Devil Rays, and Colorado Rockies.

Amateur career
Kelly attended Los Alamitos High School in Los Alamitos, California and Arizona State University. In his 1990 season with the Sun Devils, he hit .376 with 21 HR and 82 RBI. As a result of his fine season with Arizona State, he won the Golden Spikes Award as the 1990 National Player of the Year. His 46 homers with ASU trail only Bob Horner for most all-time in Sun Devil history. After the 1990 season, he played collegiate summer baseball with the Orleans Cardinals of the Cape Cod Baseball League and was named a league all-star.

Professional career
Kelly was drafted 2nd overall by the Atlanta Braves in the 1991 amateur draft, and spent 6 years in the majors with 4 teams. He played in 327 major league games, hitting .241 with 22 home runs and 86 RBI. His best season came in 1998 with Tampa Bay. In 106 games he hit .240 with career highs in both homers (10) and RBI (33). Kelly will be remembered by Rays fans as being the starting left fielder for the team's first game in major league history.

Kelly retired from the Yankees organization following the 2004 season after being released.

References

External links 

1970 births
Living people
All-American college baseball players
Arizona State Sun Devils baseball players
Atlanta Braves players
Baseball players from Los Angeles
Chattanooga Lookouts players
Cincinnati Reds players
Colorado Rockies players
Colorado Springs Sky Sox players
Columbus Clippers players
Durham Bulls players
Golden Spikes Award winners
Greenville Braves players
Indianapolis Indians players
Major League Baseball left fielders
Major League Baseball right fielders
Omaha Royals players
Orleans Firebirds players
Richmond Braves players
Tampa Bay Devil Rays players
National College Baseball Hall of Fame inductees
Alaska Goldpanners of Fairbanks players